The 2019–20 Cyprus Basketball Division A was the 53rd season of the Cyprus Basketball Division A, the top-tier level men's professional basketball league on Cyprus.

Due to the coronavirus pandemic, the league was suspended on 17 March 2020.

Teams and locations

Regular season

League table

Results

Cypriot clubs in European competitions

References

External links
Cyprus Basketball Federation
Cyprus at Eurobasket.com

Cyprus
Basketball
Basketball
Cyprus Basketball Division 1